Ramkot may refer to:
Ramkot, Jammu and Kashmir, India
Ramkot, Nepal
Ramkot Fort, Azad Kashmir, Pakistan